Peter M. Callan (January 17, 1894 – January 9, 1965) was an American politician who served as a member of the Illinois House of Representatives from 1959 to 1965.

Early life and education 
Born in Chicago, Illinois, Callan went to Holy Family School, St. Ignatius College Prep, and Loyola University Chicago.

Career 
Callan worked for the Commonwealth Edison Company and the LaSalle Extension University. He was the chief clerk for the Cook County Highway Department. He was involved with the Democratic Party. Callan served in the Illinois House of Representatives from 1959 until his death in 1965.

Personal life 
Callan died at St. Anne's Hospital, in Chicago, Illinois, from a heart ailment.

Notes

1894 births
1965 deaths
Politicians from Chicago
Loyola University Chicago alumni
Democratic Party members of the Illinois House of Representatives
St. Ignatius College Prep alumni
20th-century American politicians